Auriculoceryx is a genus of moths in the family Erebidae erected by Jeremy Daniel Holloway in 1988.

Species
Auriculoceryx basalis (Walker, [1865])
Auriculoceryx kannegieteri (Rothschild, 1910)
Auriculoceryx pterodactyliformis (Holloway, 1976)
Auriculoceryx transitiva (Walker, 1862)

References

External links

Syntomini
Moth genera